Diglycidyl aniline is an aromatic organic chemical in the glycidyl compound family. It is used to reduce the viscosity of epoxy resin systems. It has the empirical formula C12H15NO2 and the IUPAC name is N,N-bis(oxiran-2-ylmethyl)aniline. The CAS number is 2095-06-9. It is REACH registered in Europe with the EC number 218-259-5. A key use is in the viscosity reduction of epoxy resin systems functioning as a reactive diluent.

Alternative names
 Diglycidylaniline
 N,N-Diglycidylaniline
 N,N-bis(oxiran-2-ylmethyl)aniline
 Oxiranemethanamine, N-(oxiranylmethyl)-N-phenyl-
 Bis(epoxypropyl)phenylamine
 Bis(2,3-epoxypropyl)aniline
 Bis(oxiranylmethyl)benzenamine
 Benzenamine, bis(oxiranylmethyl)-

Manufacture and synthesis
Many glycidyl ethers are manufactured by addition of epichlorohydrin to a species with the aid of a Lewis acid as catalyst to form a halohydrin. This process is followed by washing with sodium hydroxide in a dehydrochlorination reaction. This diglycidyl compound being basic and nitrogen based, does not need this type of catalyst. One of the quality control tests would involve measuring the Epoxy value by determination of the epoxy equivalent weight in addition to viscosity.

Uses
The use of the diluent in epoxy systems affects the mechanical properties and microstructure of epoxy resins. The kinetics of cure of this Diglycidyl amine with epoxy resin networks have been studied. It has also been used to synthesize other materials including ion-exchange resins.

Toxicity
The toxicity profile has been studied and published.

References

Further reading

External websites
  Technical Data Sheet
 Huntsman commercial product
 Diglycidyl ether based on aniline Parchem.com 

Reactive diluents